Stine Lise Hattestad Bratsberg (born 30 April 1966) is a former Norwegian freestyle skier. She won an Olympic gold medal in the 1994 Olympics on Lillehammer and bronze from the Albertville Olympics. She also won the overall World Cup in 1988 and 1993.

References

1966 births
Living people
Norwegian female freestyle skiers
Olympic freestyle skiers of Norway
Olympic gold medalists for Norway
Olympic bronze medalists for Norway
Freestyle skiers at the 1992 Winter Olympics
Freestyle skiers at the 1994 Winter Olympics
Olympic medalists in freestyle skiing
Medalists at the 1992 Winter Olympics
Medalists at the 1994 Winter Olympics
20th-century Norwegian women